Swedish Erotica was a Swedish rock band founded in 1985 and disbanded in 1996. The same members also played in the 90's in the cover band Double Trouble. Former members of Swedish Erotica have played with Yngwie Malmsteen, TNT, Vinnie Vincent, Treat, Black Ingvars, Shotgun Messiah, John Norum, Talisman and King Diamond.

History

Prehistory 
The band was started in 1985 under the name "Swedish Beauty" by the members Magnus Axx (Axelsson, guitar), Ken "Ulf" Sandin (bass), Dag Ingebrigtsen, a former vocalist of the Norwegian band TNT, Dan Stomberg, a former guitarist in Madison, and drummer Magnus Nybratt. Stomberg was quickly replaced by Anders Allhage on guitar, best known as Andy La Rocque, guitarist of King Diamond since 1985 and who also played briefly with Death and Megadeth. This line-up played on a Norwegian album of Christmas themed rock songs with various vocalists: "The Grønne Glitrende 3 Og Dag". Nybratt then left the band and was replaced by Jamie Borger from Treat on drums. This line-up was not able to secure a record deal but Magnus Axx did not give up, changed the band name and hired new musicians.

Formation and early career 
Swedish Erotica formed in 1987 with members Magnus Axx and Morgan Le Fay (Morgan Jensen) on guitar together with bassist Johnny D'Fox (Jonas Tångström) and drummer Pete Sanders (Petter Svärd) who was soon replaced by BC Strike (Bjarne Johansson). First singer was Göran Edman, a former member of Madison who sang on two of their albums, and for a brief period in 1985 Edman fronted Vinnie Vincent Invasion between Robert Fleischmann and Mark Slaughter. Edman soon left the band to sing in former Europe guitarist John Norum's solo project, where he sang on the album Total Control (1987). Later, Edman sang for Yngwie Malmsteen and on the early demos with former Malmsteen bassist Marcel Jacob's band Talisman. Edman was replaced by an old friend of BC Strike, Tony Niva from the bands Vanessa and Traci Goes Crazy.

Record deal and debut album 
After living in Los Angeles in 1988, where they hung out with among others Kee Marcello and Stevie Nicks and met with several record companies, eventually Swedish Erotica were signed to Virgin Records thanks to A&R representative Donna Simmons, based on the strength of the band's demos with Edman singing. Towards the end of the year the band recorded demos in Tuff Studios with several different singers, including Mats Levén. In early 1989 the band recorded a demo in Norway with producer Ole Evenrude. Levén contributed background vocals, and was asked by Evenrude about why he was not the lead singer of the band. Levén told me that he had declined the offer last year but was now actually interested in fronting the band. Swedish Erotica released their first single Downtown with Niva on vocals the same year. Cooperation with Niva did not work out, and soon he was replaced by Levén.

The debut album "Swedish Erotica" came out in 1989 with Levén singing and former frontman Tony Niva featured on background vocals. Videos for the album's first two singles "R'n'R City" and "Young Wild & Free" were filmed and the videos played on MTV. Thanks to this the band got more attention than many other artists signed by Virgin Scandinavia. Second single, "Wild Young & Free," reached high on the charts but the album was delayed when the distribution company, Elektra went bankrupt, so that all copies of the debut album stayed in a warehouse for a month. The album was not distributed to the stores when demand existed, which led to reduced sales and lack of success for the band. After numerous gigs in and around their hometown, among other the clubs Alexis and White Corner and Frölunda Culture House a UK tour followed, which included a gig at the Astoria in London for 700-800 people, even before the album was released in the UK. After touring for their debut album, the band returned to the studio in the spring of 1990 to record some demos for a second studio album. Virgin evaluated the material but found it lacking material similar to the first two singles, which were written by the album's producer Ole Evenrude. The third single from the album, Hollywood Dreams, was also written by an outside writer, British songwriter Jimmy Scott.

Member replacement and cover bands 
About the same time Jamie Borger, who had played in the band's first version Swedish Beauty, and now was a member of the far more successful Treat, informed Levén that his band was looking for a new singer. Levén felt that Virgin did not anticipate a successful career for Swedish Erotica, and he also wanted to move to Treat's hometown of Stockholm, so he began to consider leaving the band. He discussed with a manager at the Virgin that he wanted to leave the band and was told that the label was more interested in him than the band and he was offered a solo project. But the singer decided to leave the label and join the established Swedish band Treat, where he sang on their self-titled album in 1992, while Swedish Eroticas second album remained unreleased.

Bjarne was replaced by Jonas Olsson on drums while Levén was replaced by former Slobobans Undergång singer Anders Moller, who previously had replaced Goran Edman on vocals in Madison and also sang in a cover band Crazy Train. Later Jonas Tångström was replaced on bass, first by Terry Barajas who later became the drummer in Abysmal Dawn and then by Ken Sandin, a former member of bands Alien and Da Vinci, and also the precursor to the band, Swedish Beauty. During this period, the same members played around Gothenburg in the cover band Double Trouble, covering songs by, among others Guns N' Roses, Poison, Nirvana, Pearl Jam and Magnus Uggla.

1993 Bjarne Johansson played as a guest musician in a new version of Shotgun Messiah with the stage name "BJ", and abandoned thus Swedish Erotica, and was replaced by Jamie Borger, recently Treat but also the very first drummer in Swedish Beauty, the same person who earlier had persuaded Levén to leave the band in favor of Treat.

Second album and split 
1995, with a new contract with a small company Empire Records, Swedish Erotica finally released a second album called Blindman's Justice, recorded in Bauhaus Studios in Gothenburg and mixed by Michael Ilbert. After the album was released frontman Möller had great success with his other band, pop-rockers Black Ingvars, topping the Swedish album charts and touring successfully. This and the general musical climate dominated by grunge and alternative rock led to the Swedish Erotica finally disbanding in 1996.

Recent events - the third album 
The former frontman Mats Levén has participated in several projects and is one of the most established singers in the Swedish metal scene. Following his time in Treat, he was involved in AB/CD, a parody of AC/DC and released the album Cut the Crap! 1995. Later bands include Abstract Algebra, At Vance, Fatal Force, Therion and many others. 2012 Leven briefly fronted Candlemass after they got rid of former front man Robert Lowe.
2005, the German company MTM Music released a compilation by Swedish Erotica - Too Daze Gone.

Morgan Jensen moved on to a successful career as a writer in film and television, Axx operated until early 2019 one of the most popular rock clubs in Sweden, Sticky Fingers in Gothenburg, while Möller and Sandin remained musicians in various constellations over the years. Axx is also credited on one Motörhead album as one of the few outside writers ever to receive a songwriting credit together with the band on one song, "Civil War" on the "Overnight Sensation" album.

This disc contains several recordings with Levén that were meant for the second album. The recordings were made before Levén left the band in favor of Treat. There are also old demos recorded at the beginning of the band's career, different sessions from before they were signed. Three of the songs are from the demo that gave them the recording contract with Virgin.

Discography 
Swedish Erotica (1989) – set list:
Side A: "Rock 'n roll City" (4.25); "Love on the Line" (4:19); "We're Wild, Young and Free" (4:43); "Hollywood Dreams" (4:26); "Love Hunger" (5:01)
Side B: "Love Me or Leave Me" (4:27); "Downtown" (3:55); "She Drives Me Crazy" (3:31); "Loaded Gun" (3:59); "Rip It Off" (4:24); "Break the Walls" (4:38).
Blindman's Justice (1995) – now with Anders Möller (also in Black-Ingvars) on vocals. Track listing: "White Sister"; "Heaven, Hell or Hollywood"; "Blindman's Justice"; Too Good to Be True"; "King of Pain"; "Blue Movies"; "Back in the Saddle"; "Sweetest of Sins"; "Rough Enough"; "Show a Little Lace";  "Satisfied".
Too Daze Gone ...; (2005) – set list: "Down 2 Bizniz"; "Skin On Skin"; "Fire With Fire"; "Too Daze Gone"; " Muscle In Motion"; "Show a Little slip"; "Blue Movies"; "Terri"; "Break The Walls" (1987); "Roll Away the Stone" (1987); "Can You Stand The Heat" (1988); "Terri" (1987); "Goodbye to Romance" (1986); "Open Arms" (1986); "Love On The Line" (1986); "Loaded gun".
 Swedish Erotica Remaster (August 2007) – remastered re-release of first album with a number of different versions of the more old songs. Track listing: "Rock and Roll City"; "Love On The Line"; "We're Wild, Young And Free"; "Hollywood Dreams"; "Love Hunger"; "Love Me Or Leave Me"; "Downtown"; "She Drives Me Crazy"; "Loaded Gun"; "Rip It Off"; "Break The Walls"; "Hollywood Dreams" (Acoustic Version); "Downtown" (Toni Niva Version); "Rock and Roll City" (Deep Hannover mix); "Loaded Rap" (Rap Version Of "Loaded Gun").

Members at dissolution
 Magnus Axx (guitar, 1985–1996)
 Anders Möller (vocals, 1990–96)
 BC Strike (Bjarne Johansson) (drums, 1989–93, 1995–96)
 Morgan Le Fay (Morgan Jensen) (guitar, 1988–96)
 Ulf Ken (Ken Sandin) (bass, 1985–88, 1993–96)

Former members
 Andy La Rocque Anders Allhage (guitar, 1985)
 Jamie Borger (drums, 1985–88, 1993–94)
Jonas Olsson (drums, 1994–95)
 Dag Ingebrigtsen (vocals, 1985–88)
 Dennis Nybratt (drums, 1985)
Pete Sanders "Petter Svärd" (drums, 1987–88)
 Dan Stomberg (guitar, 1985–86)
 Tony Niva (vocals, 1988–1989)
 Goran Edman (vocals, 1988)
 Jonas Tångström "Johnny D. Fox" (bass, 1988–1990)
 Terry Barajas (bass, 1990–92)
 Mats Levén "Matthew S. Leven" (vocals, 1989–90)

References

Musical groups established in 1985
Musical groups disestablished in 1996
Swedish heavy metal musical groups
1985 establishments in Sweden